Dimitrios Gouvelis was a military leader of the  Greek War of Independence and politician. 

Hailing from Karpenisi, Dimitrios Gouvelis was an armatolos during the final years of Ottoman rule in Greece. When the Greek War of Independence broke out, he formed his own armed band, and fought in the Siege of Karpenisi, the Battle of Dervenakia, and in the Battle of Agios Vlasios. In 1824, the provisional Greek government named him prefect of Karpenisi and garrison commander of Mount Apokleistra. In 1825 he was promoted to chiliarch. He was later promoted to general rank, and was elected to the national assemblies of 1832 and 1843. He was the brother of Konstantinos Gouvelis.

References

19th-century Greek people
Greek generals
People from Karpenisi
Greek people of the Greek War of Independence